The Bod Transmitter (also known as the Brașov Transmitter) is the name of the transmitter facility for the central longwave radio station near Bod, Romania. 

The transmitter was designed by the engineer Gheorghe Cartianu-Popescu and built in 1933–34. At the time it was one of the tallest structures in Europe. The transmitter—the first longwave radio station in Eastern Europe—was inaugurated in the presence of Guglielmo Marconi.

The Bod Transmitter currently operates on a frequency of 153 kHz with an output power of 1,200 kW although this value mas not always used. During nighttime, power was lowered to half. During the 80's and 90's, probably to reduce costs, spare energy and parts and reduce wear out, its power varied between 400 and 800 kw (nighttime and daytime). Even so, it had a good coverage.

Until 1985, it operated on 155 kHz, and until 1965 on 160 kHz. 
Between 1936 and 1965 the power was 150 KW. In 1965, the old mast and transmitter were decommissioned, and the new antenna and new Thomson transmitter (1200 kw) were put in service. 

Since 2003, a new solid-state transmitter from Harris was installed. The New transmitter is DRM compatible, has digital modulation. Despite its lower power, only 200 kw, it provides good coverage for Romania (can be received all over Romania), and border countries. During nighttime, it can be received all across Europe, however most European countries switched off their AM (Both MW and LW) transmitters.

See also
 List of famous transmission sites

References

External links
 
 Diagram of the transmitter
 

Radio in Romania
Towers in Romania
Transmitter sites in Romania
1934 establishments in Romania
Towers completed in 1934